Andrzej Rusław Fryderyk Nowicki (b. 27 May 1919 in Warsaw – d. 1 December 2011 in Warsaw) was a Polish philosopher of culture, a specialist in the history of philosophy and of atheism, in Italian philosophy of the Renaissance and in religious studies and a connoisseur of the fine arts, poet and diplomat.

In the years 1937–1939 he studied philosophy, psychology and Italian studies at the University of Warsaw. He resumed his studies in philosophy during the World War II in underground education. His teachers were, among others: Tadeusz Kotarbiński, Władysław Tatarkiewicz, Władysław Witwicki.

Nowicki conceived his own philosophical system which he called "the ergantropic and incontrological philosophical system of meetings within things". He worked as an academic at the University of Warsaw (1952–63), the University of Wrocław (1963–73), the Maria Curie-Skłodowska University in Lublin (1973–91) and achieved the rank of a professor.

He was co-founder and chairman of the Association of Atheists and Freethinkers and of the Polish Association for Religious Studies. He was the founder and editor-in-chief of the "Euhemer" magazine. He was the grandmaster of the Grand Orient of Poland in 1997–2002 and was a member of the committee of the Front of National Unity in 1958.

Later in his life he developed an interest in the Chinese language.

References

1919 births
2011 deaths
Polish atheists
Atheist philosophers
Atheism activists
University of Warsaw alumni
Academic staff of the University of Warsaw
Academic staff of the University of Wrocław
20th-century Polish philosophers
20th-century atheists
21st-century atheists
Polish Freemasons